Nanton Summer Root Beer is a root beer brand produced in Canada by Nanton Water & Soda Ltd.

References
Nanton Water Products

Root beer
Soft drinks
American soft drinks
Canadian drinks